The following is a list of presidents of the Fédération Internationale de Football Association (FIFA), the world association football governing body.

Presidents Daniel Burley Woolfall, Rodolphe Seeldrayers, and Arthur Drewry died during their term in office.

The current president is Swiss-Italian Gianni Infantino, elected on 26 February 2016 during an extraordinary session of the FIFA Congress. Prior to his election, Cameroonian Issa Hayatou was acting president after the impeachment of Sepp Blatter on 8 October 2015, who was given an eight-year ban from all football-related activities on 21 December 2015 (reduced to six years on 24 February 2016), which was renewed for six years on 24 March 2021.

Presidents of FIFA

Notes

Timeline

See also
List of association football competitions
List of presidents of AFC
List of presidents of CAF
List of presidents of CONCACAF
List of presidents of CONMEBOL
List of presidents of OFC
List of presidents of UEFA

References

External links
 

 
FIFA
Presidents of FIFA